David Leslie, 1st Lord Newark (c. 1600–1682) was a Scottish Royalists general, General Leslie may refer to:

Alexander Leslie (British Army officer) (1731–1794), British Army major general
Alexander Leslie, 1st Earl of Leven (1580–1661), Scottish Lord General in command of the Army of the Covenanters
Andrew Leslie (general) (born 1957), Canadian Forces lieutenant general
John Leslie, 10th Earl of Rothes (1698–1767), British Army general
Walter Leslie (field marshal) (1607–1667), Scottish-born Holy Roman Empire general
Walter Leslie (Indian Army officer) (1876–1947), British Indian Army general